The German-National Party was a political party in Austria.

History
The party contested seats in Austria in the 1907 elections in Cisleithania, receiving 0.2% of the vote. In the 1911 elections its vote share rose to 0.6%.

After World War I the party contested the 1919 Constitutional Assembly elections, in which it finished in third place with 5.8% of the national vote, winning 8 seats.

References

Defunct political parties in Austria
German nationalism in Austria
German nationalist political parties
Nationalist parties in Austria